The Millstone River is a  tributary of the Raritan River in central New Jersey in the United States.

The Millstone River begins in western Monmouth County and flows westward through northern Mercer County and northward through southern Somerset County, draining into the Raritan River at Manville.  Almost three quarters of its length is paralleled by the Delaware and Raritan Canal. Both the Millstone River and parallel canal provide drinking water to large portions of central New Jersey and provide recreational uses as well.

Parts of the river demarks the border between Middlesex and Mercer Counties, which also forms the boundaries between the Second and Third Districts of the Federal Reserve.

Course

It flows northeast and turns north before picking up a tributary and crossing CR-1, Sweetmans Lane. It then crosses Baird Road before crossing SR-33 and flowing past the watershed of the Cranbury Brook.

It turns west, crossing Perrineville Road and Applegarth Road. Meanwhile, it receives many small tributaries. It crosses the New Jersey Turnpike, before flowing through the East Windsor Open Space Acquisition. It then crosses CR-639 and Route 130 before picking up a tributary and flowing into Fischer Acres Associates. It crosses Old Cranbury Road and turns southwest before receiving Rocky Brook and making a turn to the northwest.

It then turns west and crosses Old Trenton Road, John White Road, and Southfield Road before flowing alongside the West Windsor Planning Incentive and crossing Cranbury Road. It receives Cranbury Brook and Bear Brook before receiving Devils Brook and crossing US-1 (Brunswick Pike). It then flows into Carnegie Lake and crosses the D&R Canal, which it closely parallels the rest of its downstream journey.

It turns northeast, receiving Stony Brook from the southwest before turning north again. It receives Harrys Brook and exits the Carnegie Lake. It then enters the D&R Canal State Park before crossing NJ27. It receives Beden Brook before crossing the Griggstown Causeway and receiving the Simonson Brook directly afterward. By the time it receives Beden Brook, it is paralleled by CR-533, River Road. 

It then receives the Ten Mile Run and Six Mile Run before crossing Blackwells Mills Road. It receives a tributary from Colonial Park and crosses Weston Causeway. It receives Royce Brook before flowing past the Somerset Christian College, one of the few structures built on the land between the D&R Canal and the Millstone River. By the time it crosses Royce Brook, CR-533 has separated from it and turned into Manville.

Flooding

The Millstone River basin has suffered a number of severe flooding events over the past 200 years.  Hurricane Floyd in September 1999 produced a particularly severe flood in the basin, especially in the Lost Valley section of Manville, which sits on a flood plain between the Millstone River and the Raritan River. Severe flooding once again occurred after Hurricane Irene swept through the area in 2011.

In 2016 the U.S. Army Corps of Engineers and New Jersey Department of Environmental Protection jointly conducted a flood risk management feasibility study on the Millstone River Basin to determine if flooding can be mitigated or controlled. The study focused on Manville, determined to be at highest risk from flooding, but concluded that none of the suggested improvements were economically feasible and therefore recommended no federal action to reduce flood risk.

Water supply
The Millstone River provides drinking water to tens of thousands of households and businesses in Central New Jersey.  A water intake pumping station is located where the Millstone River and Raritan River meet.  The water is purified and distributed by the  New Jersey American Water.

Commercial history
In earliest colonial times as land routes began to supplant sea shipping, commerce between the emerging centers New York City and Philadelphia was carried by stage coach along a direct route from South Amboy to Bordentown. Much later that route became a railroad.

A series of New Jersey towns still extant sprouted up along the stage coach route, including South Amboy, Sayreville, South River, Spotswood, Helmetta, Jamesburg, Cranbury, Hightstown, Windsor, Robbinsville, and Bordentown.  In general, the stage coach took a bee-line route, straight as the crow flies, between the Raritan Bay at South Amboy and the Delaware River at Bordentown.

As the country grew and its economy began to thrive, large buoyant barges supported by water on canals emerged as much more suitable for heavy shipping. Unlike the stage coaches, however, routes for canals were obliged to follow the most level land — riverbeds. Hence the importance of the Millstone River which provides a north–south waterway through New Jersey connecting the two great cities of Philadelphia and New York.

The Millstone River is an important tributary of the Raritan River. The Raritan River empties into the Raritan Bay, a bay of the Atlantic Ocean. The Raritan Bay is contiguous to New York Harbor and separates the New York City Borough of Staten Island (Richmond County) from Central New Jersey along with the Arthur Kill a more narrow channel of water between Staten Island and New Jersey.

As the Raritan River flows eastward towards Raritan Bay, it joins the Millstone River flowing north in the vicinity of Bound Brook, New Jersey. The Millstone River traces an arc through several New Jersey Counties, originating in Monmouth County and flowing more-or-less west through Mercer County, then northwest through Somerset County, then northward towards Bound Brook.

Delaware and Raritan Canal 

The Delaware and Raritan Canal runs along east side of the Millstone River for much of its length, from Lake Carnegie near the border between West Windsor Township and Princeton to the location where the Millstone River empties into the main course of the Raritan River in Franklin Township.

There the canal continues along the right (south) bank of the Raritan.  The land between canal and river is a flood plain that generally consists of swamps, wooded areas and some farmland.  A number of spillways allow water to run off from the canal into the Millstone River during periods of heavy water flow.

In Lawrenceville, New Jersey, at a site known as Bakers Basin today located along U.S. Route 1, the canal makes the few mile remaining connection into Trenton, the state capital, and then into the Delaware River.

Hence the Millstone and Raritan Rivers enabled the major shipping route between New York and Philadelphia in the early 19th century. From New York, of course, goods could be shipped north along the Hudson River and Erie Canal to upstate New York, and thence to Western Pennsylvania, Ohio, and other Great Lakes States upstream of Niagara Falls.

Gallery

Tributaries

Beden Brook
Pike Run
Rock Brook
Bear Brook
Cranbury Brook
Cedar Brook
Devils Brook
Shallow Brook
Harrys Brook
Heathcote Brook
Carters Brook
Heathcote Brook Branch
Indian Run Brook
Little Bear Brook
Millstone Brook
Peace Brook
Rocky Brook
Timber Run
Royce Brook
Simonson Brook
Six Mile Run
Stony Brook
Baldwins Creek
Duck Pond Run
Honey Branch
Lewis Brook
Peters Brook
Stony Brook Branch
Woodsville Brook
Ten Mile Run
Van Horn Brook

Crossings
New Jersey Route 33 in Millstone Township, New Jersey
New Jersey Turnpike
U.S. Route 130 connecting Cranbury Township, New Jersey to East Windsor Township, New Jersey
U.S. Route 1 connecting Plainsboro Township, New Jersey to West Windsor Township, New Jersey
New Jersey Route 27 connecting Kingston, New Jersey to Princeton, New Jersey
County Route 518 connecting Griggstown, New Jersey to Rocky Hill, New Jersey
Griggstown Causeway connecting Griggstown, New Jersey to Hillsborough, New Jersey
Blackwell Mills
Amwell Avenue
Interstate 287

See also
List of rivers of New Jersey

References

External links
U.S. Geological Survey: NJ stream gaging stations

Rivers of Monmouth County, New Jersey
Rivers of Mercer County, New Jersey
Rivers of Middlesex County, New Jersey
Tributaries of the Raritan River
Rivers of Somerset County, New Jersey
Rivers of New Jersey
Delaware and Raritan Canal